The 2006–07 United Hockey League season was the 16th season of the United Hockey League (Colonial Hockey League before 1997), a North American minor professional league. Ten teams participated in the regular season and the Rockford IceHogs won the league title.

Offseason
The Bloomington PrairieThunder launched as an expansion team.

The Motor City Mechanics announced it would suspend operations for the 2006-07 season.

The Richmond Riverdogs relocated to Chicago to become the Chicago Hounds after missing opportunities to renew their lease at Richmond Coliseum.

The Missouri River Otters folded due to poor attendance, issues with Family Arena and steep workman’s comp bill

The Roanoke Valley Vipers folded due to poor attendance, complaints of ticket sales, criticism of owners and marketing and declining local interest in the area.

The Adirondack Frostbite suspended operations after failing to reach an agreement with the Glens Falls Civic Center.

The Danbury Trashers folded after their owner was arrested on 72 charges, pleaded guilty to the charges and was sentenced to 87 months in prison.

Regular season

Colonial Cup-Playoffs

External links
 Season 2006/07 on hockeydb.com

United Hockey League seasons
UHL
UHL